The 1967 season was the Chicago White Sox' 67th season in the major leagues, and its 68th season overall. They finished with a record of 89–73, good enough for fourth place in the American League, 3 games behind the first-place Boston Red Sox. The team's earned run average (ERA) of 2.45 is the lowest in the live-ball era (1920 onwards).

Offseason 
 October 17, 1966: Smoky Burgess was released by the White Sox.
 October and November 1966: In separate transactions, Wilbur Wood was sold by the Pirates to the Chicago White Sox. The White Sox also sold Juan Pizarro to the Pirates.
 December 14, 1966: Johnny Romano and Lee White (minors) were traded by the White Sox to the St. Louis Cardinals for Walt Williams and Don Dennis.

Regular season

Opening Day lineup 
 Walt Williams, LF
 Don Buford, 3B
 Tommie Agee, CF
 Pete Ward, 1B
 Ken Berry, RF
 Jerry McNertney, C
 Ron Hansen, SS
 Jerry Adair, 2B
 John Buzhardt, P

Season standings

Record vs. opponents

Notable transactions 
 May 6, 1967: Bill Skowron was traded by the White Sox to the California Angels for Cotton Nash and cash.
 June 15, 1967: Ed Stroud was traded by the White Sox to the Washington Senators for Jim King.
 July 22, 1967: Bill Southworth and a player to be named later were traded by the White Sox to the New York Mets for Ken Boyer and a player to be named later. The Mets completed their part of the deal by sending Sandy Alomar Sr. to the White Sox on August 15. The White Sox completed their part of the deal by sending J. C. Martin to the Mets on November 27.

Roster

Player stats

Batting 
Note: G = Games played; AB = At bats; R = Runs scored; H = Hits; 2B = Doubles; 3B = Triples; HR = Home runs; RBI = Runs batted in; BB = Base on balls; SO = Strikeouts; AVG = Batting average; SB = Stolen bases

Pitching 
Note: W = Wins; L = Losses; ERA = Earned run average; G = Games pitched; GS = Games started; SV = Saves; IP = Innings pitched; H = Hits allowed; R = Runs allowed; ER = Earned runs allowed; HR = Home runs allowed; BB = Walks allowed; K = Strikeouts

Awards and honors 
 1967 MLB All-Star Game
 Tommie Agee, reserve
 Ken Berry, reserve
 Joe Horlen, reserve
 Gary Peters, reserve

Farm system 

LEAGUE CHAMPIONS: AppletonDuluth-Superior affiliation shared with Chicago Cubs

Notes

References 
 1967 Chicago White Sox at Baseball Reference

Chicago White Sox seasons
Chicago White Sox season
Chicago